Conspiritus is the fifth studio album of the left field metal/rock project Ewigkeit, released in 2005 by Earache Records.

The album displays a mix of industrial, ambient and electronic music set to a metal back-drop and centres on a hypothetical global conspiracy (often referred to as the Illuminati) whose aim is to install a totalitarian global government that surveys its citizens' every move.

Fogarty's work on the album took over 14 months, with extensive research into the world of conspiracy and its many associated theories. It is to date the most researched music album ever created on this subject - crowned by the fact that along with the orthodox methods of music website / magazine promotion and distribution, it is also sold through the website of conspiracy researcher David Icke.

Track listing
Intro / the Hypothesis
It's Not Reality
Square Sunrise
The Nightmare Institution
Far Away from Heaven
Transcend the senses
The Thought Police
How to Conquer the World (live from the Bohemian Grove)
Theoreality
Conspiritus

All music/lyrics written, recorded & produced by James Fogarty.
All artwork by Mick Usher.
Mixed by John Fryer.

References

2005 albums
Ewigkeit albums
Earache Records albums